Toopranpet is a village in Nalgonda district in Telangana, India. It falls under Choutuppal mandal.

Background 
There are many engineering colleges in the villages like Netaji Engineering College and Dhruva Institute of Engineering & Technology. It is about 9.4 Km from the famous Ramoji film city. It takes 11 minutes journey to reach Toopranpet from Ramoji film city. It is very near to Mount Opera, Theme park located on Hyderabad - Vijayawada Highway, at Batasingaram. Mount Opera is amusement park and Resort. Distance between Mount Opera and Toopranpet is about 7.3 kilometres.

Choutuppal and Bhoodan Pochampalli are nearby crowded and developed areas to Toopranpet. Distance between Toopranpet and Choutuppal is about 15.8 kilometres. Distance between Toopranpet and Bhoodan Pochampalli is about 15.1 kilometres. 

It is located very near to Nehru Outer Ring Road, and surrounded by many Engineering Colleges.  The distance between Outer Ring Road and Toopranpet is about 12 kilometres. Rajiv Gandhi International Airport can be reached via Nehru Outer Ring Road located about 12 kilometres from Toopranpet. The airport is 49.8 kilometres from Toopranpet.

References

Villages in Nalgonda district